MSB Educational Institute (also known as Al Madrasa Tus Saifiya Tul Burhaniyah) is an Islamic educational institute headquartered in India. It was founded by Mohammed Burhanuddin II in 1985, with its first two branches in Mumbai, India and Nairobi, Kenya. It is accredited with the ICSE and IGCSE educational boards and is operated under the purview of the office of the Dai al-Mutlaq of the Dawoodi Bohras. The institute has branches in 25 cities in 7 countries across India, Pakistan, East Africa, and the Middle East.

History 
Islamic prophet Muhammad made it equally incumbent, upon every Muslim man and woman, to pursue knowledge. In the Dawoodi Bohras community, both religious and secular education is highly valued. The community has a very high rate of literacy and there is no disparity between the opportunities to learn between boys or girls. As part of this philosophy, MSB Educational Institute teaches an integrated syllabus of sciences, humanities, languages, and theological subjects with equal numbers of girls and boys.

In 2017, Mufaddal Saifuddin inaugurated the MSB branch in Kuwait, which is largest MSB branch in the world at 1600 students.

Campuses 
As of 2022, there are 24 branches of MSB worldwide with 12,013 students.

References 

Educational institutions in India
Islamic educational institutions
Educational institutions in Pakistan